is a train station on the Hanshin Railway Kobe Kosoku Line in Nagata-ku, Kobe, Hyōgo Prefecture, Japan.

History
The station opened on 7 April 1968.

Damage to the station was caused by the Great Hanshin earthquake in 1995.

Station numbering was introduced on 1 April 2014.

Connecting lines
Kobe Municipal Subway Seishin-Yamate Line – Nagata (Nagatajinjamae) Station

References 

Railway stations in Hyōgo Prefecture
Railway stations in Japan opened in 1968